The Indian Film Festival Japan is a film festival in Japan. It works to promote Indian movies both commercial and independent.

History 

The idea for the Indian Film Festival Japan originated with Suresh Thati, CEO of Thati Media Corporation, a Japanese company that specializes in media consulting, IPTV services, publishing and media production. The 1st Indian Film Festival Japan was held in 2012. 
IFFJ 2012, 
IFFJ 2013,
IFFJ 2014,
IFFJ 2015,

Selection process

The programming department at IFFJ is responsible for a preliminary screening of the movies. The best 20 movies out of all the submitted movies are selected to be part of the movie festival.

Audience Award

Best Subcontinental  Award Winners

Best Documentary Award Winners

Jury

The international jury which chooses the three best movies during the final evaluation round and is composed of people from the movie industry.

References

External links 
 Indian Film Festival Japan Official Website

Film festivals in Tokyo
Internet film festivals
Short film festivals
2011 establishments in Japan
Film festivals established in 2011
J